According to the Treaty of Trianon, the city of Sopron in western Hungary and its surroundings were assigned to Austria. After an uprising in 1921 in this region, a referendum was held and 65.8% of the votes were in favor of belonging to Hungary. This referendum was accepted by the major powers and the transition of Sopron and its surrounding 8 villages from Austria to Hungary was the only serious territorial revision in the years following the Treaty of Trianon.

In literature
 Gyula Somogyvári („Gyula diák”): És mégis élünk (novel)
 Dr. Jenő Héjjas: A Nyugat-magyarországi felkelés. Budapest, 1929.

References

Sources

External links
 
 
 

1921 in Hungary
Wars involving Hungary
Rebellions in Austria
Referendums in Hungary
Aftermath of World War I in Hungary
Aftermath of World War I in Austria
1921 in Austria
Conflicts in 1921